Beaumont is a suburb of Adelaide in the City of Burnside. Founded as a purpose-built village by Sir Samuel Davenport in 1848, it initially struggled due to high land prices in the area. However, with Adelaide's inevitable expansion residents eventually settled. The early village had quite a cosmopolitan flavour–although predominantly Anglo-Saxon like most of Australia at that point, many of Beaumont's early residents were veterans of the British Navy or Army or had lived in other countries for some time.

Beaumont House, constructed around 1850 for Augustus Short, still stands and is now owned by the National Trust of South Australia. Edward Burton Gleeson, the founder of the Mid North town of Clare originally owned a farm within the boundaries of Beaumont in the early 1840s, which he named "Gleeville".  He became insolvent, sold the property to Davenport in 1842 and moved to his country property "Inchiquin" in the Clare Valley region. The original village was centred on a small park known as the "Beaumont Common" (or to residents simply as "The Common"). The suburb has now expanded south-east in the direction of the hills however, with newer developments now on the face of the Adelaide Hills.

Beaumont Common

Beaumont Common was an English style Common. Ownership of The Common was originally vested in trust only for those residents living within the Village of Beaumont, that is the bounds of Cooper Place, Beaumont Road (now Glynburn Road), Dashwood Road and Devereaux Road (as if it actually continued due south to Dashwood instead of meandering to the east at West Tce). Originally it was fenced and gated with the key being available only to residents of the Village of Beaumont. The fence and gates were removed in the early 20th century. The trust deed was lodged at the Land Titles Office Adelaide. Trustees remaining on the death of a trustee appointed a successor by unanimous not majority vote. The last trustees included the late Alfred Scammell (of Fauldings) and J B Cleland. They appointed Burnside Council a co-trustee following an undertaking by Council to maintain The Common as an open space public park. As the remaining trustees aged, Burnside Council then attempted many times to instead build on the Common, against the wishes of Beaumont residents.

Residents were successful in ensuring what later became the JB Cleland kindergarten, The Hazelwood Park Swimming Pool, the Beaumont Uniting Church Tennis Courts and the Beaumont Bowling Club were all erected elsewhere. Several attempts over the years to build public lavatories and entertainment facilities were also rebuffed. Burnside Council refused to agree to any further trustee appointments as trustees died. The remaining trustees attempted to appoint Gordon Ditter (Ditters Nuts). Council refused. Fearing an attempt to obtain control of the Common by attrition, residents petitioned the State Government in 1971 to remove Burnside Council as a trustee by act of SA Parliament. Burnside Council objected. Several heated meetings between Council and residents ensured. To resolve the impasse the State Government declared Beaumont Common a public park under the Parks and Gardens Act with clauses prohibiting any future building to ever take place on Beaumont Common. Later revisions of the Act have had those clauses removed. No resident consultation on their removal ever took place.

In popular culture
Beaumont is mentioned in the Redgum song "Beaumont Rag" featured on the band's 1978 album If You Don't Fight You Lose.

References
Notes

General
The Paddocks Beneath, Elizabeth Warburton
Cockburn, Rodney (1999) South Australia – What's in a Name? Axiom Publishing
Beaumont House, E R Simpson (1993) 

Suburbs of Adelaide